Jan Roth (10 November 1899 – 4 October 1972) was a Czech cinematographer. During World War I he served in the Austro-Hungarian Navy. Roth started his career as a lighting technician at the New German theatre in Prague. In 1926 he became a chief lighting technician at Karel Lamač's Kavalírka film studio. Roth later served as Otto Heller's assistant on Lamač's films. In 1934 he started to work as a cameraman. He soon became of the most prolific cinematographers of the Czechoslovak cinema. Following the German occupation of Czechoslovakia in 1939 he continued to work for both Czech and German productions at Barrandov Studios. Roth often collaborated with directors Otakar Vávra and Martin Frič. He was noted for his ability to create Chiaroscuro effects.

Selected filmography
 Three Men in the Snow (1936)
 Irca's Romance (1936)
 Escape to the Adriatic (1937)
 Lojzička (1936)
 Děvče za výkladem (1937)
 Battalion (1937)
 Virginity (1937)
 Blackmailer (1937)
 The Magic House (1939)
 Arthur and Leontine (1940)
 Ladies in Waiting (1940)
 Goodbye, Franziska (1941)
 We Make Music (1942)
 Beloved Darling (1943)
 The Second Shot (1942)
 Love Premiere (1943)
 Experiment (1943)
 A Kiss from the Stadium (1948)
 The Proud Princess (1952)
 The Princess with the Golden Star (1959)
 Nejlepší ženská mého života (1968)

References

External links 
 

1899 births
1972 deaths
Czech cinematographers
People from Náchod
Czech people of German descent